Transactions on Aspect Oriented Software Development is a peer-reviewed scientific journal that covers aspect-oriented software development techniques in all phases of the software life cycle, from requirements and design to implementation, maintenance, and evolution. The editors-in-chief are Shmuel Katz (Technion – Israel Institute of Technology) and Mira Mezini (Darmstadt University of Technology). The journal is published by Springer Science+Business Media.

External links 
 
  Print: 
 Online: 

Springer Science+Business Media academic journals
Computer science journals
Publications with year of establishment missing
English-language journals